Donald Robert James Keenan (August 8, 1938 – November 29, 2005) was a Canadian professional ice hockey goaltender who played in one National Hockey League game for the Boston Bruins during the 1958–59 season, on March 7, 1959 against the Toronto Maple Leafs. He previously played for St. Francis Xavier University.

Career statistics

Regular season and playoffs

See also
List of players who played only one game in the NHL

External links

1938 births
2005 deaths
Boston Bruins players
Canadian ice hockey goaltenders
Place of death missing
Ice hockey people from Toronto
Toronto Varsity Blues ice hockey players